Scrap Branch is a stream in Washington County in the U.S. state of Missouri.

Scrap Branch was so named because the "scrapping" of mining ores occurred near its course.

See also
List of rivers of Missouri

References

Rivers of Washington County, Missouri
Rivers of Missouri